Emma Abbott Ridgway (1903 – 1981) was an American politician who served as a member of the Washington House of Representatives for five terms, from 1945 to 1947 and from 1949 to 1957.  She represented Washington's 40th legislative district as a Democrat.  She served on a number of legislative committees over her five terms, chairing the educational institutions committee in the 1945 term.  In party leadership, she was vice chair of the state Democratic Central Committee from 1936 to 1946, state chair of the Democratic Women's Division, and served as a delegate to the Democratic National Conventions of 1944 and 1948.

Outside the legislature, she was affiliated with Alpha Chi Omega, the American Legion Auxiliary, the P.E.O. Sisterhood, the Phi Kappa Phi and Pi Lambda Theta honor societies, and the Sedro-Woolley Soroptomist Club.  She was manager of the Washington State Building at the 1939 New York World's Fair.

References

Further reading
 “Republicans Win All County Offices, County GOP Victory Biggest Since 1930,” The Courier-Times (Sedro-Woolley), November 7, 1946
 “Emma Ridgway Loses; Sharpe Wins by 5 Votes,” The Courier-Times (Sedro-Woolley), November 15, 1956
 “State Aide Quits over G.O.P. Policy,” The Seattle Times, August 23, 1965
 Obituaries, Emma Abbott Ridgway,” Sedro-Woolley Courier-Times, May 6, 1981
 Bourasaw, Noel V., “Dream Theatre, Abbott Motor Co., Dad Abbott family, Emma and Hugh Ridgway,” Skagit River Journal, 2004

1903 births
1981 deaths
Democratic Party members of the Washington House of Representatives
Women state legislators in Washington (state)